The Girl Scout Little House located at 448 W. 6th Ave. in Ashland in Clark County, Kansas was listed on the National Register of Historic Places in 2015.

Background
Its construction was a Works Progress Administration project during 1937, with the building opened in early 1938. It is built of native stone quarried north of Ashland.

References

External links

National Register of Historic Places in Clark County, Kansas
Buildings and structures completed in 1938
Clubhouses in Kansas
Civilian Conservation Corps in Kansas
Girl Scouts of the USA
Scout halls